Microtis atrata, commonly known as the swamp mignonette orchid or yellow onion orchid and sometimes as Microtidium atratum, is a species of orchid endemic to southern Australia. It has a single thin leaf and up to forty or more yellowish-green flowers. The flowers are the smallest of any Australian ground-dwelling orchid. The orchid usually grows in large colonies after fire and although small, are easily seen because of their very large numbers in their blackened surroundings.

Description
The petals are egg-shaped and concave and the labellum is oblong to egg-shaped. Flowering occurs from September to December and is stimulated by fire the previous summer.

Taxonomy and naming
Microtis atrata was first formally described in 1840 by John Lindley and the description was published in A Sketch of the Vegetation of the Swan River Colony. The specific epithet (atrata) is a Latin word meaning "dressed in black", referring to the colour of the dried flowers.

Some authorities give this species the name Microtidium atratum but this name is not widely accepted.

Distribution and habitat
The swamp mignonette orchid occurs in the south-west of Western Australia, the south-east of South Australia, in southern Victoria and northern Tasmania. It grows in swampy places and in winter-wet depressions, sometimes in standing water and can form colonies of enormous numbers of plants after summer fire.

Conservation
Microtis atrata is classified as "not threatened" in Western Australia by the Western Australian Government Department of Parks and Wildlife, but is regarded as "endangered" in South Australia and as "rare" in Tasmania.

References

External links
 

atrata
Endemic orchids of Australia
Orchids of South Australia
Orchids of Tasmania
Orchids of Victoria (Australia)
Orchids of Western Australia
Plants described in 1840